The Nimrod International Journal of Prose and Poetry is a literary journal established in 1956 that publishes fiction, nonfiction, and poetry.

History 
The journal was established in 1956 at the University of Tulsa by students at the University of Tulsa, and its first editor-in-chief was James Land Jones. The journal began as a thrice-yearly publication, but since 1970, it has been published twice a year, once in the spring and once in the fall.

Notable contributors include Gish Jen, Natalie Diaz, Jacob M. Appel, and Sharon Solwitz, among others.

Awards 
Stories from the journal have been published in The Best American Short Stories and The Best American Essays, and have won the O. Henry Award and the Pushcart Prize anthologies, among others.

References

External links
 

Literary magazines published in the United States
University of Tulsa
Quarterly journals